ZND may refer to:

The IATA code for Zinder Airport
ZND detonation model
znd, the ISO 639-5 code for Zande languages